Chico is an unincorporated community and census-designated place (CDP) in Kitsap County, Washington, United States. Named in 1889 for a local Indian, Chico is located on the Dyes Inlet waterfront, southeast of Silverdale. At the 2010 census the community had a population of 2,259.

Geography
Chico is in central Kitsap County, bordered to the north by Silverdale and to the south by the Erlands Point and Kitsap Lake CDPs. It is bordered to the east by Dyes Inlet, a tidal water body that connects to Puget Sound via Port Washington Narrows through Bremerton, then via the strait of Port Orchard. It is bordered to the west by Camp Wesley Harris and Newberry Hill Heritage Park. The northern border is Newberry Hill Road, which separates Chico from Silverdale. Chico Creek forms the southern boundary with Erlands Point and Kitsap Lake to the south. Washington State Route 3 runs through the community, leading north  to Port Gamble and south  to the western side of Bremerton.

References

Unincorporated communities in Washington (state)
Unincorporated communities in Kitsap County, Washington
Census-designated places in Washington (state)
Census-designated places in Kitsap County, Washington